Flavobacterium faecale is a Gram-negative, rod-shaped and strictly aerobic bacterium from the genus of Flavobacterium which has been isolated from the faeces of antarctic penguins.

References

faecale
Bacteria described in 2014